Justin Schein is an American documentary filmmaker and cinematographer. He has been cinematographer on over 60 films and is the co-founder of Shadowbox Films. He is best known for his work on cinéma vérité films that include America Rebuilds: A Year at Ground Zero, No Impact Man, and Left on Purpose.

Early life and education

Schein was born in New York and attended Horace Mann School in The Bronx prior to enrolling in Johns Hopkins University in Baltimore, Maryland. He graduated from Johns Hopkins in 1990 and began working as an intern at Great Projects, a film company in New York City. He later returned to school where he earned a master's degree in documentary filmmaking from Stanford University.

Career

Schein has been involved in directing and cinematography for more than 20 years. He has been the cinematographer on over 60 films that have appeared on networks such as The BBC, The Discovery Channel, HBO, and PBS. Schein is also the founder of Shadownbox Films, a film studio he started in 1998 along with co-founder David Mehlman, a fellow Stanford graduate.

One of Schein's more notable early projects is America Rebuilds: A Year at Ground Zero, a documentary that looked at the cleanup of Ground Zero after the September 11 attacks as well as the debate over what should replace the Twin Towers. He collaborated on the project with Daniel Polin, president of Great Projects Film Company, the company where he interned after graduating from Johns Hopkins. Polin was producer on the documentary while Schein worked as co-producer and cinematographer. America Rebuilds was narrated by Kevin Spacey and appeared on PBS on the one year anniversary of the attacks.

In 2009, Schein released No Impact Man, a documentary film he directed with Laura Gabbert based on the book of the same title by Colin Beavan. The film, which premiered at the Sundance Film Festival and opened theatrically September 4, 2009, follows Colin Beavan and his family during their year-long experiment to have sustainable zero impact on the environment. The rights of the film were picked up by Oscilloscope Laboratories.

Schein worked as the cinematographer for the documentary My So-Called Enemy. Released in 2010, filming began in the summer of 2002 and documents the relationships between six Jewish and Palestinian girls who come to the United States for a leadership camp. The film documents the bonds that grow between the girls in absence of the violence where the girls live back home. It screened at numerous film festivals, including winning a Cine Golden Eagle and being awarded the Best Documentary at the 2010 Boston Jewish Film Festival.

Schein's most recent projects include Left On Purpose, a documentary on the life of political activist Mayer Vishner. Schein originally wanted to document the rebellious legacy of Vishner when he finds out Vishner has severe depression and wants to end his own life as his last political act. Schein and Vishner become friends during the filming and Vishner did not reveal his wishes until later in the filming. Vishner committed suicide on August 22, 2013, twelve hours after dropping his cat off with writer Michael Ventura in Texas. The film was funded through a successful Kickstarter campaign in 2015 as well as supported from Sundance Documentary Fund, The Jerome Foundation, and Catapult Film Fund. The night before his death, Vishner told Ventura while smiling "part of me really wants to see the movie."

Left On Purpose began its festival run in the fall of 2015 and went on to win awards at multiple domestic and international film festivals including Audience Awards at DOC NYC and Woodstock Film Festival. As of February 10, 2017, it is available for streaming on multiple major online platforms.

Partial filmography

References

External links
 Shadowbox Films official website
 

Living people
American documentary filmmakers
Stanford University alumni
Johns Hopkins University alumni
Year of birth missing (living people)